Ponzano Veneto is a comune (municipality) in the Province of Treviso in the Italian region Veneto, located about  north of Venice and about  northwest of Treviso.

Ponzano Veneto borders the following municipalities: Paese, Povegliano, Treviso, Villorba, Volpago del Montello.

Ponzano Veneto is home to the headquarters of United Colors of Benetton, one of the biggest Italian fashion houses and clothing labels in the world. The headquarters of the company is situated in the Villa Minelli, which was bought by the group in 1969 and became the main headquarters of the company in the 1980s.

History 
In 1807, Ponzano, Paderno, and Merlengo—three frazioni (subdivisions) located a few kilometers North of the city of Treviso—formed the Comune di Ponzano, which then became Ponzano Veneto in 1869.

It is likely that there was some kind of inhabitation in antiquity, due to the fact that the area that is now Ponzano Veneto was crossed by via Postumia, the Roman road connecting Genoa and Aquileia.

References

External links
 Official website

Cities and towns in Veneto